Matthew Paul Deane (born 29 August 1978) is a Thai-Australian singer, model, actor and television presenter.

Early life and education
Deane was born on August 29, 1978, to an Australian father, Christopher Deane, and a Thai Chinese mother, Songsri Chanthavanij. He graduated from Cairns State High School and Rangsit University.

Career
Deane started an entertainment career in 1996 as a singer under GMM Grammy, debuted an album "Code Love," and switched to RS Public Company Limited in 2000 with a successful recorded album "Matthew Mania." He was a VJ in MTV Thailand and began acting in 2009. He hosted a Thai boxing reality show Thai Fight from 2010 to 2015.

Personal life
Deane and Lydia Sarunrat, a Thai R&B singer, got married in 2015. The couple have three children together.

On March 13, 2020, Deane announced that he had tested positive for Covid-19. He and his wife were admitted to Bumrungrad International Hospital for treatment and was discharged on April 18, 2020.

Filmography

Film

As actor

Dramas

Series
In 2021, Deane appeared in the Netflix series Sleepless Society: Nyctophobia playing 'Pete', the estranged husband of a grief-stricken woman who struggles to find peace until a mysterious boy appears, claiming to be her reincarnated son.

Sitcom

Master of Ceremony: MC ON TV

Advertising

References

1978 births
Living people
Matthew Deane
Matthew Deane
Matthew Deane
Matthew Deane
Matthew Deane
Matthew Deane
Matthew Deane
Australian people of Thai descent
Matthew Deane
Matthew Deane